Matthew Jocelyn (born 1958) is the former artistic and general director of Canadian Stage, the largest not-for-profit theatre in Toronto, Ontario, Canada. Prior to his appointment at Canadian Stage, Jocelyn was the artistic and general director of the Atelier du Rhin in Alsace, France for 10 years. Under his leadership, the organization became a major centre for multidisciplinary arts in France. He was named Chevalier des Art et des Lettres (Knight of the Order of Arts and Letters), by the French Ministry of Culture in July 2008.

Career
Jocelyn has worked as a theatre and opera director, an arts administrator, producer and advocate, and an opera librettist and translator.

Born in Canada, he studied at Mount Allison University, l'Université d'Aix-Marseille, McGill University and Oxford, where he was a Rhodes Scholar. He moved to France in 1982, where he held the position of lecteur d'anglais at the École Normale Supérieure, rue d'Ulm.  After spending periods of time at Jerzy Grotowski's Teatr Laboratorium in Wroclaw, Poland, and Tanaka Min's Body Weather Laboratory in Hachioji, Japan, he created and performed dance-theatre productions in France, Germany and Spain, co-founding the Théâtre de l'Autre Rive in Paris in 1983, and the Théâtre Des-Hérités in 1992.  In 1995, he joined the Centre de Formation Lyrique of the Paris National Opera, in charge of stage work, where he established a program of semi-staged operas in the amphitheatre of the Opéra Bastille, many of which toured France. In 1998, he was named artistic and general director of the Atelier du Rhin, Centre Dramatique, in Colmar, France, where he was also responsible for creating the Jeunes Voix du Rhin, the opera studio of the Opéra national du Rhin.

Sara Angel in Maclean's Magazine called Jocelyn "one of this country's most brilliant creative forces - and one of its most controversial."

Productions include

Theatre
Isaac, the Laughter of the Aged : collective creation, Toronto, Canada
The Atheist’s Tragedy by Cyril Tourneur : Printemps des Comédiens, Montpellier, France
On l’appelle Cendrillon by Jean Cuenot : Théâtre de l’Ecrou, Fribourg, Suisse
Three Sister by Anton Tchékhov : national tour, France
Dancing at Lughnassa by Brian Friel : Théâtre de l’Ecrou, Fribourg, Suisse and tour
The Love of the Nightingale by Timberlake Wertenbaker : Atelier du Rhin, Colmar
l’Annonce faite à Marie by Paul Claudel : Atelier du Rhin, Colmar and national tour  (Prix du souffleur, best production in Paris 2002)
fils nat. by Graham Smith : Atelier du Rhin, Colmar
Our Country’s Good by Timberlake Wertenbaker : Atelier du Rhin, Colmar 
The Liar by Pierre Corneille : Stratford Festival, Canada
The Architect by David Greig : Atelier du Rhin, Colmar
Il ne reste que 50 minutes avant la fin du spectacle, based on the writings of Steven Pinker : Atelier du Rhin, Colmar
Macbeth by  William Shakespeare : Atelier du Rhin, Colmar and national tour
Fernando Krapp Wrote me this Letter by Tankre Dorst : Canadian Stage, Toronto
The Game of Love and Chance by Marivaux : Canadian Stage, Toronto
This by Melissa James Gibson : Canadian Stage, Toronto
Harper Regan by Simon Stephens : Canadian Stage, Toronto

Opera
La voix humaine by Francis Poulenc : Centre de formation lyrique, Opéra Bastille 
Carmen by Georges Bizet  : Centre de formation lyrique, Opéra Bastille
Larmes de Couteau and Alexandre bis by Bohuslav Martinu : Opéra national du Rhin, Théâtre de l’Athénee, Paris
La Cecchina by Nicola Piccini : Opéra national du Rhin
La clemenza di Tito by Gluck : Opéra national du Rhin
Le roi Arthus by Ernest Chausson : Opéra royal de la Monnaie, Brussels
Reigen by Philippe Boesmans : Opéra national du Rhin, Théâtre de l’Athénee, Paris 
La Carmençita based on Georges Bizet : Opéra national du Rhin, Théâtre de l’Athénee, Paris
L’Étoile by Emannuel Chabrier : Opéra national du Rhin
Die Frau Ohne Schatten by Richard Strauss : Opéra Royal de la Monnaie, Brussels
Lucia di Lamermoor by Gaetano Donizetti : Oper Frankfurt
Julie by Philippe Boesmans : Théâtre d’Orléans, Théâtre de l’Athénee, Paris
Die Trilogie der Frauen (Erwartung by Arnold Schönberg, Le bal by Oscar Strasnoy, Das Gehege by Wolfgang Rihm) :  Hamburgische Staatsoper
Requiem by Oscar Strasnoy : Teatro Colon, Buenos Aires  (ACMA award for best production in Argentina, 2014)

Opera libretti
Le bal by Oscar Strasnoy : editions Billaudot  (première, Hamburgische Staatsoper, 2010)
Requiem by Oscar Strasnoy : editions Billaudot (première, Teatro Colon, Argentina, 2014)
Hamlet by Brett Dean : Boosey and Hawkes (première, Glyndebourne Festival, 2017)

Translations
La tragédie de l’Athée by Cyril Tourneur (co-translated by Charles Ginvert) : editions Avant-Scène Théâtre, Paris
Nightingale by Timberlake Wertenbaker : editions Harmattan, Paris
L’Architecte by David Greig : éditions Avant-Scène Théâtre, Paris
Fernando Krapp Wrote me this Letter by Tankred Dorst

Teaching positions
École Normale Supérieure, rue d’Ulm (lecteur d’anglais : 1982-83)
Université de Toulouse - le Mirail  (summer courses in English : 1983, 1984)
University of Toronto - University College  (guest professor, theatre : 1990)
American University of Paris (guest professor, rhetoric : 1994)

Awards and recognition
Rhodes Scholarship, Oxford University, 1980–82
Chevalier des Arts et des Lettres, French Ministry of Culture, 2009
Honorary Doctor of Laws (LLD), Mount Allison University, 2015

References

Canadian theatre directors
Canadian theatre managers and producers
Canadian translators
Chevaliers of the Ordre des Arts et des Lettres
1958 births
Living people
Canadian artistic directors